Teinoptila is a genus of moths of the family Yponomeutidae.

Species
Teinoptila antistatica - (Meyrick, 1931)
Teinoptila bolidias - (Meyrick, 1913)
Teinoptila brunnescens - (Moore, 1888)
Teinoptila calcarata - (Meyrick 1924)
Teinoptila clavata - Q. Jin, S.X. Wang & H.H. Li, 2009
Teinoptila corpuscularis - (Meyrick 1907)
Teinoptila guttella - Moriuti, 1977
Teinoptila ingens - Gershenson & Ulenberg 1998
Teinoptila interruptella - Sauber, 1902
Teinoptila taprobanae - Sohn, 2021

References

Yponomeutidae